The list of Austrian field marshals denotes those who held the rank of Feldmarschall in the Austrian or Austro-Hungarian armies.

Austrian Empire

Austria-Hungary

See also
 List of German field marshals
 List of Marshals of Austria
 List of Austro-Hungarian colonel generals

Footnotes

 
Austria
Austro-Hungarian military-related lists